Skeletophyllon andamani is a moth in the family Cossidae. It was described by Yakovlev in 2011. It is found on the Andaman Islands.

References

Natural History Museum Lepidoptera generic names catalog

Zeuzerinae
Moths described in 2011